Donskoy Selsoviet is a rural settlement in Zadonsky District of Lipetsk Region, Russia.
It is located in the central part of Lipetsk Region and in the northern part of Zadonsky District. The area of the settlement is 150.11 square kilometers (58 sq mi). Its administrative center is Donskoye. Population: 5,055 (2014); 5,002 (2010 Census).

References

Rural localities in Lipetsk Oblast